MonsterBag is a puzzle stealth video game created by IguanaBee and published by Sony Computer Entertainment.

History 
The game was released for PlayStation Vita on April 7, 2015.

Gameplay 
The story centers around V, a little monster who wants to be with its friend, Nia. Unfortunately, they live in a world afraid of monsters, so V must catch up to Nia without being seen by any humans.

Each level in the game requires V to solve a puzzle while avoiding detection by the humans. MonsterBag, despite its cute, cartoon appearance, features violent graphics and dark comedy, hiding a deep story behind the characters.

References 

2015 video games
PlayStation Vita games
PlayStation Vita-only games
Puzzle video games
Sony Interactive Entertainment games
Stealth video games
Video games developed in Chile
Single-player video games